Wilhelmina Hay Abbott (22 May 1884 – 17 October 1957), also known by the name "Elizabeth Abbott," was a Scottish suffragist, editor, and feminist lecturer, and wife of author George Frederick Abbott.

Early life and education
Abbott was born Wilhelmina Hay Lamond in Dundee, Scotland, on 22 May 1884. Her mother was Margaret McIntyre Morrison and her father was Andrew Lamond, a jute manufacturer and commission agent. She had one older sister, Isabel Taylor Lamond. The family moved to Tottenham when her father received a job as managing director of Henry A. Lane & Co. She was educated at the City of London School for Girls and in Brussels. She trained in London for secretarial and accounting work between 1903 and 1906, but then attended University College London in the summer of 1907, where she pursued a broader course of ethics, modern philosophy, and economics. As a young woman she began using the first name "Elizabeth."

Career
In 1909 Elizabeth Lamond started organizing for the Edinburgh National Society for Women's Suffrage. In that role she campaigned with Mary McNeill in the Orkney Islands. She took a position on the executive committee of the Scottish Federation of Women's Suffrage Societies the next year, along with Dr. Elsie Inglis. McNeill and Inglis became doctors in the Scottish Women's Hospitals for Foreign Service. 

During World War I, Lamond toured extensively in India, Australia, and New Zealand as a lecturer, for two years, raising money for the Scottish Women's Hospitals. Of her travels, she declared, "I received unbounded hospitality." After the war, she served as an officer of the International Woman Suffrage Alliance, and edited its newsletter, Jus Suffragii.

Concerned primarily about economic opportunities for women, she joined Chrystal MacMillan, Lady Rhondda, Emmeline Pethick-Lawrence and others in founding the Open Door Council (later Open Door International) in 1926. Abbott chaired the Open Door Council in 1929. She also chaired the Association for Moral and Social Hygiene for ten years, and was active with the organization for much longer.

In her later years, she continued work on women's economic security, as co-author of The Woman Citizen and Social Security (1943), which responded to gender inequalities in the Beveridge Report.

Personal life
She married travel writer and war correspondent George Frederick Abbott in 1911. They had one son, Jasper A. R. Abbott, born that same year. Abbott died in 1957, age 73.

References

1884 births
1957 deaths
British women in World War I
Scottish suffragists
People from Dundee
Scottish activists
Scottish women activists
Scottish Women's Hospitals for Foreign Service volunteers
People educated at the City of London School for Girls